P. traversii may refer to a two different species of shrub.  The specific epithet traversii refers to someone with the surname 'Travers,' in these cases it's New Zealand naturalist Henry H. Travers (1844–1928).

 Pimelea traversii, a shrub in the family Thymelaeaceae
 Pseudowintera traversii, or Travers horopito, a shrub in the family Winteraceae